Krez (Udmurt and Russian: крезь) is an Udmurt string instrument (chordophone) similar to the Russian gusli. The mythical origin of the krez is detailed in the Udmurt national epic, the Dokjavyl. The krez was used to accompany some shamanic ritual dances, and the large krez (быдӟым крезь) was used for music during the holiday of Bulda.

See also
Kusle

References

Baltic psaltery
Udmurt musical instruments